Giuseppe Virgili (24 July 1935 – 10 June 2016) was an Italian footballer who played as a forward.

Club career
Born in Udine, Virgili played for Udinese, Fiorentina, Torino, Bari, Livorno and Taranto at club level.

International career
Virgili also scored two goals in 7 appearances for the national team between 1955 and 1957.

Later life and death
Virgili died in hospital at the age of 80, following an illness. He was inducted into the Fiorentina Hall of Fame in 2013.

References

1935 births
2016 deaths
Italian footballers
Italy international footballers
Udinese Calcio players
ACF Fiorentina players
Torino F.C. players
S.S.C. Bari players
U.S. Livorno 1915 players
Taranto F.C. 1927 players
Serie A players
Serie B players
Association football forwards